Robert or Bob Duncan may refer to:

Arts
 Robert Duncan (poet) (1919–1988), American poet
 Robert Duncan (writer) (born 1952), American music critic
 Robert Duncan (actor) (born 1952), British TV actor
 Robert Duncan (composer), Canadian composer

Politics
 Robert Duncan (politician) (1850–1925), Unionist Party (Scotland) MP for Govan
 Robert B. Duncan (1920–2011), U.S. Representative from Oregon
 Mike Duncan (Robert Michael Duncan, born 1951), 62nd Chairman of the Republican National Committee
 Robert M. Duncan Jr. (born 1978), United States Attorney and son of Mike Duncan
 Robert L. Duncan (born 1953), Texas state senator

Science and engineering
 Robert C. Duncan (engineer) (1923–2003), American engineer
 Robert C. Duncan (astrophysicist), American astrophysicist
 Robert Duncan (physicist), American physicist

Other people
Robert Duncan of Robert Duncan and Company, a shipyard in the Port of Glasgow on the Clyde in Scotland
Robert C. Duncan (athlete) (1887–1957), British Olympic athlete
Robert Duncan (footballer) (1891–1984), Australian rules footballer
Robert Duncan (pilot) (1920–2013), flying ace
Robert Morton Duncan (1927–2012), U.S. federal judge
Robert Duncan (rower) (born 1931), Australian rower
Robert Duncan (bishop) (born 1948), Archbishop of the Anglican Church in North America
Bob Duncan, a character in Good Luck Charlie

See also
Bobby Duncum
Robert Duncan Bell (1878–1953), Acting Governor of Bombay during the British Raj
Robert Duncan Luce, American mathematician and social scientist
Robert Duncan MacPherson, American mathematician at the Institute for Advanced Study and Princeton University
Robert Duncan McNeill (born 1964), American director, producer, and actor
Robert Duncan Milne (1844–1899), late-19th century San Francisco science fiction writer
Robert Duncan Sherrington, Australian politician
Robert Duncan Wilmot (1809–1891), Canadian politician and a Father of Confederation
Robert Duncan Wilmot Jr. (1837–1920), Canadian farmer, businessman and politician
Robert Duncanson (disambiguation)